Nioella nitratireducens is a Gram-negative, non-spore-forming, rod-shaped and aerobic bacterium in the genus Nioella which has been isolated from seawater from Espalamaca, Azores.

References 

Rhodobacteraceae
Bacteria described in 2015